Duke Ling of Qin (died 415 BC) was from 424 to 415 BC the 25th ruler of the Zhou Dynasty Chinese state of Qin that eventually united China to become the Qin Dynasty.  His ancestral name was Ying (嬴), and Duke Ling was his posthumous title.

Duke Ling's predecessor was his grandfather Duke Huai of Qin.  In 425 BC Qin general Chao (鼌) and other ministers attacked and besieged Duke Huai, and Duke Huai committed suicide.  As Duke Huai's son Crown Prince Zhaozi (昭子) died early, the ministers installed Duke Ling, Zhaozi's son, on the throne.

In 419 BC, the sixth year of Duke Ling's reign, Qin attacked the State of Wei at the city of Shaoliang (少梁, in present-day Hancheng, Shaanxi).

Duke Ling reigned for 10 years and died in 415 BC.  However, the throne was passed to his uncle Duke Jian of Qin, son of Duke Huai and younger brother of Zhaozi.  Duke Ling's own son Shixi, later known as Duke Xian, was exiled to the State of Wei.  Duke Xian would eventually ascend the throne nearly 30 years later, after Duke Jian's grandson Chuzi II was killed.

References

Year of birth unknown
Rulers of Qin
5th-century BC Chinese monarchs
415 BC deaths